Ioannes Paulus may refer to:

 Ioannes Paulus II Peninsula, Livingston Island, South Shetland Islands, Antarctica
 Ioannes Paulus Secundus, pope and saint
 Ioannes Paulus PP. I, pope
 Ioannes et Paulus, see John and Paul (disambiguation)

See also

 Ioannes
 John Paul (disambiguation)
 Paulus (disambiguation)